Zizhong County is a county of Sichuan Province, China. It is under the administration of Neijiang city.

History
During the imperial era, the area of Zhizhong County was part of Zi Prefecture.

Climate

References

 
County-level divisions of Sichuan
Neijiang